The Roman Catholic Diocese of Srikakulam is a diocese located in the city of Srikakulam in the Ecclesiastical province of Visakhapatnam in India.

History
 1 July 1993: Established as Diocese of Srikakulam from the Diocese of Visakhapatnam

Leadership

Bishops of Srikakulam (Latin Rite)
 Bishop Innayya Chinna Addagatla (1 July 1993 – 12 December 2018)
 Bishop Vijaya Kumar Rayarala

Parishes
 Cathedral of Our Lady of Mercy

References

External links

 
 GCatholic.org 
 Catholic Hierarchy 

1993 establishments in Andhra Pradesh
Christian organizations established in 1993
Christianity in Andhra Pradesh
Roman Catholic dioceses and prelatures established in the 20th century
Roman Catholic dioceses in India
Srikakulam district
Uttarandhra